Qazi Ahmad Saeed is a Pakistani politician who was a Member of the Provincial Assembly of the Punjab, from 2002 to May 2018.

Early life and education
He was born on 1 June 1968 in Rahim Yar Khan District.

He has a Bachelor of Laws which he obtained in 1993 from University of Karachi and a degree of Master of Arts which he received in 1995 from Shah Abdul Latif University.

Political career
He was elected to the Provincial Assembly of the Punjab as a candidate of Pakistan Muslim League (Q) (PML-Q) from Constituency PP-286 (Rahimyar Khan-II) in 2002 Pakistani general election. He received 29,130 votes and defeated an independent candidate.

He was re-elected to the Provincial Assembly of the Punjab as a candidate of Pakistan Muslim League (F) from Constituency PP-286 (Rahimyar Khan-II) in 2008 Pakistani general election. He received 26,715 votes and defeated a candidate of PML-Q.

He was re-elected to the Provincial Assembly of the Punjab as a candidate of Pakistan Peoples Party from Constituency PP-286 (Rahimyar Khan-II) in 2013 Pakistani general election.

References

Living people
Punjab MPAs 2013–2018
Punjab MPAs 2008–2013
Punjab MPAs 2002–2007
1968 births
Pakistan People's Party MPAs (Punjab)
Pakistan Muslim League (F) politicians
Pakistan Muslim League (Q) MPAs (Punjab)